"All Night, All Right" is a song by British-Australian singer Peter Andre featuring Warren G. It was released in January 1998 as the third and final single from his third studio album, Time (1997). The album version features Coolio. 

"All Night, All Right" peaked at number sixteen on the UK Singles Chart. It also peaked at number 13 in New Zealand and 30 in Australia.
 
In an album review, Brendan Swift from AllMusic said "'All Night, All Right' featuring Coolio, is perhaps the best of the album" calling it "a slick up-tempo dance outing with liberal doses of funk".

Track listings
Maxi single CD1
 "All Night All Right" (radio edit) – 3:29
 "All Night All Right" (Brooklyn Funk Club mix) – 4:51
 "All Night All Right" (Brooklyn Funk R&B mix) – 4:54
 "All Night All Right" (Damien's Late Night Jam) – 5:28
 
Maxi single CD2
 "All Night All Right" (radio edit) – 3:29
 "All Night All Right" (Forthright Classy Club mix) – 8:17
 "All Night All Right" (Forthright Slamming Dub B mix) – 7:08
 "All Night All Right" (Stu Allan & Peter Pritchard mix) – 7:01

Charts

References

 

 
1997 songs
1998 singles
Songs written by Peter Andre
Songs written by Montell Jordan
Mushroom Records singles
Peter Andre songs